Sangyuan is a town under the administration of Li County in Baoding, Hebei, China. , it has 12 villages under its administration.

References 

Township-level divisions of Hebei
Li County, Hebei